Marmeh (also Romanized as Mārmeh and Mārmah) is a village in Banaruiyeh Rural District, Banaruiyeh District, Larestan County, Fars Province, Iran. At the 2006 census, its population was 471, in 107 families.

References 

Populated places in Larestan County